Martin Van Den Bossche (born 10 March 1941) is a retired Belgian professional road bicycle racer. Van Den Bossche finished in the top 10 of the Tour de France twice, and won the Mountains classification of the 1970 Giro d'Italia.

Major results

1963
 4th Druivenkoers Overijse
1964
 1st Schaal Sels-Merksem
 4th Grand Prix des Nations
 5th Road race, National Road Championships
 5th Liège–Bastogne–Liège
 5th GP Stad Zottegem
 7th Grand Prix de Denain
1965
 3rd Liège–Bastogne–Liège
 4th Scheldeprijs
 5th Grand Prix Pino Cerami
 7th Grand Prix de Denain
 9th GP Stad Zottegem
1966
 2nd Grand Prix de Denain
 9th Road race, National Road Championships
 10th Road race, UCI Road World Championships
 10th Overall Tour de France
1967
 3rd Circuit des Frontières
 3rd GP Stad Vilvoorde
 8th Overall Tour of Belgium
 8th Grand Prix Pino Cerami
1968
 1st Stage 3a (TTT) Paris–Luxembourg
 2nd Coppa Ugo Agostoni
 4th Overall Setmana Catalana de Ciclisme
1st Stage 1 
 5th Giro di Lombardia
 5th Tre Valli Varesine
 6th Grand Prix Pino Cerami
 8th Ronde van Limburg
1969
 1st Grote Prijs Beeckman-De Caluwé
 2nd Overall À travers Lausanne
 2nd Milano–Torino
 3rd Druivenkoers Overijse
 4th Giro di Lombardia
1970
 2nd Druivenkoers Overijse
 3rd Overall Giro d'Italia
1st  Mountains classification
 4th Overall Tour de France
 7th Road race, National Road Championships
 8th Overall Paris–Nice
 9th Overall Giro di Sardegna
 10th Overall Tour de Romandie
1971
 9th Grand Prix Pino Cerami
1972
 1st Giro del Lazio
 1st Stage 1a (ITT) Escalada a Montjuïc
 4th Scheldeprijs

Grand Tour general classification results timeline

External links 

Belgian male cyclists
1941 births
Living people
People from Bornem
Cyclists from Antwerp Province